Mishio is a Japanese name (meaning salt) which may refer to:
Mishiodono (jinja & no mamori no kami), Mishiohama, Mishio kumiiresho, & Mishio yakisho, parts of the Ise Grand Shrine

People
Fukazawa Mishio, author of Duan Surk of the Dengeki Bunko publishing label
 (born 1959), member of Love, Peace & Trance, band project of Haruomi Hosono
Mishio Ishimoto, Japanese seismologist

Characters
Amano Mishio of Kanon
Maeno Mishio of Mnemosyne
Manami Mishio of Great Dangaioh

See also
Michio